Susanne Nielsen is a former Danish international cricketer who represented the Danish national team between 1993 and 1999. Her sister, Inger Nielsen, also played for Denmark.

She holds the record for scoring the most number of ducks in Women's Cricket World Cup history (6)

References

Living people
Danish women cricketers
Denmark women One Day International cricketers
Year of birth missing (living people)